Harold Blitman (February 12, 1930 – March 23, 2012) was a basketball coach. Blitman was head coach of the American Basketball Association team the Miami Floridians during the 1969-1970 season and of The Floridians during the 1970-1971 season.

Blitman was head coach at Cheyney State from 1962 to 1969.

The Miami Floridians began the 1969-1970 season winning only 5 of their first 20 games under head coach Jim Pollard. On November 29, 1969, Pollard was fired and replaced by Blitman. The team finished with a record of 23 wins and 61 losses. Management problems beyond Blitman's control were a factor; on April 13, 1970 the ABA took over management of the team. The team's average home attendance for the season was 2,724. Ned Doyle took over as majority owner of the team after the season.

In the 1970-1971 season, playing as The Floridians with home games in different parts of the state, the team finished with a record of 37 wins and 47 losses, good for fourth place in the Eastern Division. Average attendance rose to 4,020. However, Blitman was fired as coach on January 15, 1971 and was replaced by Bob Bass.

References

1930 births
2012 deaths
Basketball coaches from Pennsylvania
Cheyney Wolves men's basketball coaches
Miami Floridians coaches

Place of birth missing
Sportspeople from Philadelphia